is a Japanese light novel series written by Keiichi Sigsawa and illustrated by Kouhaku Kuroboshi.  The series is a spin-off of Reki Kawahara's Sword Art Online series.  A manga adaptation by Tadadi Tamori launched in 2015, and an anime television series adaptation produced by studio 3Hz aired between April and June 2018.  Both the light novels and the manga adaptation are published in North America by Yen Press, while the anime is licensed by Aniplex of America.

Plot

Due to the incident that occurred in VR MMORPG Sword Art Online—where 10,000 players were trapped in the game on launch day—the popularity of VR games has plummeted due to fear of similar incidents. The NerveGear, SAO's VR device, was recalled and destroyed, but with the launch of its successor, the AmuSphere, combined with release of the license-free development support package the "Seed", the popularity of VR games saw a sudden resurgence.

The story follows Karen Kohiruimaki, a university student with a complex about her abnormal height.  She begins playing a VR game called Gun Gale Online after it gives her the short, cute avatar that she has always wanted.

Media

Print

Dengeki Bunko announced on September 18, 2014, that Keiichi Sigsawa would be writing a light novel based on Reki Kawahara's Sword Art Online light novel series.  The series is supervised by Kawahara and illustrated by Kouhaku Kuroboshi, and ASCII Media Works published the first novel under the Dengeki imprint on December 10, 2014. During their panel at Anime NYC on November 18, 2017, Yen Press announced that they had licensed the series.

Tadadi Tamori launched a manga adaptation in ASCII Media Works seinen manga magazine Dengeki Maoh on October 27, 2015. During their panel at Sakura-Con on April 15, 2017, Yen Press announced that they had licensed the series in North America.

Anime
An anime television series adaptation was announced at the Dengeki Bunko Fall Festival 2017 event on October 1, 2017. The series is directed by Masayuki Sakoi, written by Yōsuke Kuroda, produced by Egg Firm and animated by studio 3Hz, with character designs by Yoshio Kosakai.

The series aired in Japan between April 8 and June 30, 2018, on Tokyo MX, BS11, Tochigi TV, Gunma TV, MBS and TV Aichi.  The series was released on 6 home video sets with 2 episodes each, for a total of 12 episodes.  Aniplex of America has licensed the series and simulcast the series on Crunchyroll and Hulu. Anime Limited announced that they had acquired the series for release in the United Kingdom and Ireland. Madman Entertainment acquired the series for release in Australia and New Zealand, and simulcasted the series on AnimeLab.

To promote the anime, Tokyo Marui made a limited edition FN P90 submachine gun with a pink finish as part of a collaboration with Keiichi Sigsawa and Kōji Akimoto, the latter who worked on the air gun's color. The pink P90 was raffled to the public through a raffle in a collaboration with Pizza Hut Japan, in which two of them were awarded to contestants.

Video game
Llenn, Pitohui, M, and Fukaziroh made their video game debut in Sword Art Online: Fatal Bullet as a free update. They later have a major role in the DLC episode "Dissonance of the Nexus", which is also the first time they interact with the main series characters.

Reception 
During the first half of 2015, the series was the 11th best-selling light novel series, with its first and second volumes ranking at 8th and 17th place, respectively.  The 4th volume also managed to be the 25th best-selling novel during the first half of 2016.  As of May 2018, the series had 1 million copies in print.

Notes

References

External links
  
  
 Elsa Kanzaki website 
  
 

2018 anime television series debuts
2014 Japanese novels
3Hz
Anime and manga based on light novels
Aniplex franchises
Dengeki Bunko
Dengeki Daioh
Girls with guns anime and manga
Isekai anime and manga
Isekai novels and light novels
Kadokawa Dwango franchises
Massively multiplayer online role-playing games in fiction
Muse Communication
Seinen manga
Sword Art Online
Television shows written by Yōsuke Kuroda
Virtual reality in fiction
Yen Press titles